Nasir Kandi (also Romanized as Naşīr Kandī) is a village in Salavat Rural District, Moradlu District, Meshgin Shahr County, Ardabil Province, Iran. At the 2006 census, its population was 61, in 14 families.

References 

Tageo

Towns and villages in Meshgin Shahr County